Spiegel Grove, also known as Spiegel Grove State Park,  Rutherford B. Hayes House, Rutherford B. Hayes Summer Home and Rutherford B. Hayes State Memorial was the estate of Rutherford B. Hayes, the nineteenth President of the United States, located at the corner of Hayes and Buckland Avenues in Fremont, Ohio. Spiegel is the German and Dutch word for mirror. The traditional story is that the estate was named by Hayes' uncle Sardis Birchard, who first built it for his own residence. He named it for the reflective pools of water that collected on the property after a rain shower. 

Rutherford Hayes inherited the estate and moved there in 1873. He died in 1893 and was buried in Oakwood Cemetery next to his wife who had died in 1889.  Following the gift of this home to the state of Ohio for the Spiegel Grove State Park, their bodies were reinterred at Spiegel Grove in 1915. They are buried at a memorial on the property. The Rutherford B. Hayes Presidential Center, established in 1916, is also located here.

"Old Whitey", a war horse that served during the Civil War and belonged to then-Major (later Major General) Hayes, became the mascot of the 23rd Ohio Volunteer Infantry. The horse was buried at Spiegel Grove upon his death in 1879, with a grave marker reading Old Whitey A Hero of Nineteen Battles 1861–1865.

Spiegel Grove was designated as a National Historic Landmark on January 29, 1964.

On October 15, 1966, it was added to the National Register of Historic Places.

Design

The house was built around 1860 for Sardis Birchard as a two-story brick mansion. It featured many bedrooms and a wrap-around porch. In 1880, after Rutherford B. Hayes had moved in, he expanded the house by the addition of 5 new rooms, and the massive staircase that led all the way up to the 4th floor. In 1889, 6 more rooms were added to the house, giving it its current appearance.

Tourism
The estate was given to the state for the Spiegel Grove State Park. Since then, the house has been open for tourists as a house museum. For a fee, visitors can view the various rooms as well as furniture, books, and other items in the house. Visitors are allowed to access most of the rooms on the first and second floors. The third and fourth floors are not open to the public.

See also
 Rutherford B. Hayes Presidential Center
 
 List of residences of presidents of the United States
 Presidential memorials in the United States

References

External links

 National Park Service site on Spiegel Grove
 Rutherford B. and Lucy Webb Hayes at Spiegel Grove
 Hayes Center
 
 
 

National Historic Landmarks in Ohio
National Register of Historic Places in Sandusky County, Ohio
Houses on the National Register of Historic Places in Ohio
Historic American Buildings Survey in Ohio
Houses completed in 1873
Historic house museums in Ohio
Presidential homes in the United States
Museums in Sandusky County, Ohio
Ohio History Connection
Presidential museums in Ohio
Buildings and structures in Fremont, Ohio
Houses in Sandusky County, Ohio
Tombs of presidents of the United States
Rutherford B. Hayes